The women's 48 kilograms (Extra lightweight) competition at the 2002 Asian Games in Busan was held on 3 October at the Gudeok Gymnasium.

Schedule
All times are Korea Standard Time (UTC+09:00)

Results

Main bracket

Repechage

References
2002 Asian Games Report, Page 464

External links
 
 Official website

W48
Judo at the Asian Games Women's Extra Lightweight
Asian W48